In topology and related branches of mathematics, a connected space is a topological space that cannot be represented as the union of two or more disjoint non-empty open subsets. Connectedness is one of the principal topological properties that are used to distinguish topological spaces.

Some related but stronger conditions are path connected, simply connected, and -connected. Another related notion is locally connected, which neither implies nor follows from connectedness.

Formal definition
A topological space  is said to be  if it is the union of two disjoint non-empty open sets. Otherwise,  is said to be connected.  A subset of a topological space is said to be connected if it is connected under its subspace topology. Some authors exclude the empty set (with its unique topology) as a connected space, but this article does not follow that practice.

For a topological space  the following conditions are equivalent:

 is connected, that is, it cannot be divided into two disjoint non-empty open sets.
 cannot be written as the union of two non-empty separated sets (sets for which each is disjoint from the other's closure). 

Historically this modern formulation of the notion of connectedness (in terms of no partition of  into two separated sets) first appeared (independently) with N.J. Lennes, Frigyes Riesz, and Felix Hausdorff at the beginning of the 20th century.  See  for details.

Connected components

Given some point  in a topological space  the union of any collection of connected subsets such that each contains  will once again be a connected subset. 
The maximal connected subsets (ordered by inclusion ) of a non-empty topological space are called the connected components of the space.
The components of any topological space  form a partition of : they are disjoint, non-empty and their union is the whole space.
Every component is a closed subset of the original space. It follows that, in the case where their number is finite, each component is also an open subset. However, if their number is infinite, this might not be the case; for instance, the connected components of the set of the rational numbers are the one-point sets (singletons), which are not open. Proof: Any two distinct rational numbers  are in different components. Thus each component is a one-point set.

Disconnected spaces
A space in which all components are one-point sets is called . Clearly, any totally separated space is totally disconnected, but the converse does not hold. For example take two copies of the rational numbers , and identify them at every point except zero. The resulting space, with the quotient topology, is totally disconnected. However, by considering the two copies of zero, one sees that the space is not totally separated. In fact, it is not even Hausdorff, and the condition of being totally separated is strictly stronger than the condition of being Hausdorff.

Examples

  is disconnected.
 A Euclidean plane excluding the origin,  is connected, but is not simply connected. The three-dimensional Euclidean space without the origin is connected, and even simply connected. In contrast, the one-dimensional Euclidean space without the origin is not connected.
 A Euclidean plane with a straight line removed is not connected since it consists of two half-planes.
 , the space of real numbers with the usual topology, is connected.
 The Sorgenfrey line is disconnected. 
If , then  remains simply connected after removal of countably many points.
 Every discrete topological space with at least two elements is disconnected, in fact such a space is totally disconnected.  The simplest example is the discrete two-point space.
 On the other hand, a finite set might be connected. For example, the spectrum of a discrete valuation ring consists of two points and is connected. It is an example of a Sierpiński space.
 The Cantor set is totally disconnected; since the set contains uncountably many points, it has uncountably many components.
 If a space  is homotopy equivalent to a connected space, then  is itself connected.
 The topologist's sine curve is an example of a set that is connected but is neither path connected nor locally connected.
 The general linear group  (that is, the group of -by- real, invertible matrices) consists of two connected components: the one with matrices of positive determinant and the other of negative determinant. In particular, it is not connected. In contrast,  is connected. More generally, the set of invertible bounded operators on a complex Hilbert space is connected.
 The spectra of commutative local ring and integral domains are connected. More generally, the following are equivalent
 The spectrum of a commutative ring  is connected
 Every finitely generated projective module over  has constant rank.
  has no idempotent  (i.e.,  is not a product of two rings in a nontrivial way).

An example of a space that is not connected is a plane with an infinite line deleted from it. Other examples of disconnected spaces (that is, spaces which are not connected) include the plane with an annulus removed, as well as the union of two disjoint closed disks, where all examples of this paragraph bear the subspace topology induced by two-dimensional Euclidean space.

Path connectedness 

A  is a stronger notion of connectedness, requiring the structure of a path. Again, many authors exclude the empty space (by this definition, however, the empty space is not path-connected because it has zero path-components; there is a unique equivalence relation on the empty set which has zero equivalence classes).

Every path-connected space is connected. The converse is not always true: examples of connected spaces that are not path-connected include the extended long line  and the topologist's sine curve.

Additionally, connectedness and path-connectedness are the same for finite topological spaces.

Arc connectedness  
A space  is said to be arc-connected or arcwise connected if any two topologically distinguishable points can be joined by an arc, which is an embedding .

Every Hausdorff space that is path-connected is also arc-connected; more generally this is true for a -Hausdorff space, which is a space where each image of a path is closed. An example of a space which is path-connected but not arc-connected is given by the line with two origins; its two copies of  can be connected by a path but not by an arc.

Intuition for path-connected spaces does not readily transfer to arc-connected spaces. Let  be the line with two origins. The following are facts whose analogues hold for path-connected spaces, but do not hold for arc-connected spaces:

 Continuous image of arc-connected space may not be arc-connected: for example, a quotient map from an arc-connected space to its quotient with countably many (at least 2) topologically distinguishable points cannot be arc-connected due to too small cardinality.
 Arc-components may not be disjoint. For example,  has two overlapping arc-components.
 Arc-connected product space may not be a product of arc-connected spaces. For example,  is arc-connected, but  is not.
 Arc-components of a product space may not be products of arc-components of the marginal spaces. For example,  has a single arc-component, but  has two arc-components.
If arc-connected subsets have a non-empty intersection, then their union may not be arc-connected. For example, the arc-components of  intersect, but their union is not arc-connected.

Local connectedness 

A topological space is said to be locally connected at a point  if every neighbourhood of  contains a connected open neighbourhood. It is locally connected if it has a base of connected sets.

Similarly, a topological space is said to be  if it has a base of path-connected sets.
An open subset of a locally path-connected space is connected if and only if it is path-connected.
More generally, any topological manifold is locally path-connected.

Locally connected does not imply connected, nor does locally path-connected imply path connected.

Set operations 
The intersection of connected sets is not necessarily connected.

The union of connected sets is not necessarily connected, as can be seen by considering .

This implies that in several cases, a union of connected sets  necessarily connected. In particular:

 If the common intersection of all sets is not empty, then obviously they cannot be partitioned to collections with disjoint unions. Hence the union of connected sets with non-empty intersection is connected.
 If the intersection of each pair of sets is not empty then again they cannot be partitioned to collections with disjoint unions, so their union must be connected.
 If the sets are pairwise-disjoint and the quotient space  is connected, then  must be connected. Otherwise, if  is a separation of  then  is a separation of the quotient space (since  are disjoint and open in the quotient space).

The set difference of connected sets is not necessarily connected.

Theorems 
Main theorem of connectedness: Let  and  be topological spaces and let  be a continuous function. If  is (path-)connected then the image  is (path-)connected. This result can be considered a generalization of the intermediate value theorem.
Every path-connected space is connected.
Every locally path-connected space is locally connected.
A locally path-connected space is path-connected if and only if it is connected.
The closure of a connected subset is connected.  Furthermore, any subset between a connected subset and its closure is connected.
The connected components are always closed (but in general not open)
The connected components of a locally connected space are also open.
The connected components of a space are disjoint unions of the path-connected components (which in general are neither open nor closed).
Every quotient of a connected (resp. locally connected, path-connected, locally path-connected) space is connected (resp. locally connected, path-connected, locally path-connected).
Every  product of a family of connected (resp. path-connected) spaces is connected (resp. path-connected).
Every open subset of a locally connected (resp. locally path-connected) space is locally connected (resp. locally path-connected).
Every manifold is locally path-connected.
Arc-wise connected space is path connected, but path-wise connected space may not be arc-wise connected
Continuous image of arc-wise connected set is arc-wise connected.

Graphs
Graphs have path connected subsets, namely those subsets for which every pair of points has a path of edges joining them.
But it is not always possible to find a topology on the set of points which induces the same connected sets. The 5-cycle graph (and any -cycle with  odd) is one such example.

As a consequence, a notion of connectedness can be formulated independently of the topology on a space. To wit, there is a category of connective spaces consisting of sets with collections of connected subsets satisfying connectivity axioms; their morphisms are those functions which map connected sets to connected sets . Topological spaces and graphs are special cases of connective spaces; indeed, the finite connective spaces are precisely the finite graphs.

However, every graph can be canonically made into a topological space, by treating vertices as points and edges as copies of the unit interval (see topological graph theory#Graphs as topological spaces). Then one can show that the graph is connected (in the graph theoretical sense) if and only if it is connected as a topological space.

Stronger forms of connectedness 
There are stronger forms of connectedness for topological spaces, for instance: 
 If there exist no two disjoint non-empty open sets in a topological space ,  must be connected, and thus hyperconnected spaces are also connected.
 Since a simply connected space is, by definition, also required to be path connected, any simply connected space is also connected. If the "path connectedness" requirement is dropped from the definition of simple connectivity, a simply connected space does not need to be connected.
Yet stronger versions of connectivity include the notion of a contractible space. Every contractible space is path connected and thus also connected.

In general, any path connected space must be connected but there exist connected spaces that are not path connected. The deleted comb space furnishes such an example, as does the above-mentioned topologist's sine curve.

See also

References

Further reading

 
 
 
 .

General topology
Properties of topological spaces